John McDonald AM is an Australian former rugby league footballer, coach and administrator. A tall three-quarter back, he played club football in Toowoomba, representing Queensland ten times and also gaining selection for the Australian test team. In 1969 McDonald moved south, playing in the New South Wales Rugby Football League premiership with the Manly-Warringah club. After playing for his adopted state, he toured New Zealand as Australian vice-captain. He went on to captain Manly from the flank in the club's grand final loss to Souths in the 1970 NSWRFL season.

McDonald returned to Queensland after three seasons with the Sea Eagles to captain-coach Toowoomba and was elected president of the club after his retirement. He also coached Queensland in the late 1970s and was coach of the Maroons' first State of Origin team in 1980. By the end of the decade, he had progressed to the position of President of the Queensland Rugby League (QRL) and in 1998, joined the National Rugby League Executive Committee and was named Chairman of the QRL and Australian Rugby League Board of Directors. That year he was also named "Sport Administrator of the Year" at the Queensland Sport Awards.
In 2008, rugby league in Australia's centenary year, McDonald was named at centre in the Toowoomba and South West Team of the Century.

References

External links
John McDonald at nrlstats.com

1944 births
Living people
Australia national rugby league team players
Australian rugby league administrators
Australian rugby league coaches
Australian rugby league players
Manly Warringah Sea Eagles captains
Manly Warringah Sea Eagles players
New South Wales rugby league team players
Queensland Rugby League State of Origin coaches
Queensland rugby league team coaches
Queensland rugby league team players
Rugby league centres
Rugby league fullbacks
Rugby league wingers